Harold Newton Fanjoy (November 1, 1939 – April 26, 2008) was a Canadian businessman and political figure in New Brunswick. He represented Kings Centre in the Legislative Assembly of New Brunswick as a Progressive Conservative from 1974 to 1987.

He was born in Saint John, New Brunswick, the son of I. Newton and Muriel G. Seely, and was educated there and at the New Brunswick Institute of Technology. Fanjoy served as Minister of Supply and Services from 1976 to 1982 and was president of the province's Treasury Board. Fanjoy was a former president of the New Brunswick Genealogical Society and was co-author of The Seelys of New Brunswick, published in 1992. He married Marilyn Bishop and had two sons.

References 
 Premier's message on death of Harold Fanjoy, Government of New Brunswick
Former N.B. cabinet minister dies, 68, Times & Transcript, April 30, 2008
Obituary, Telegraph-Journal, April 28, 2008

1939 births
2008 deaths
Businesspeople from Saint John, New Brunswick
Progressive Conservative Party of New Brunswick MLAs